The 2001–02 Divizia A was the eighty-fourth season of Divizia A, the top-level football league of Romania. Season began in August 2001 and ended in May 2002. Dinamo București was crowned as champion for the 16th time.

Team changes

Relegated
The teams that were relegated to Divizia B at the end of the previous season (note that although FCM Bacău lost the relegation play–off, it remained in the Divizia A, after it bought the first division place from the promoted team FC Baia Mare):
 Foresta Fălticeni
 Rocar București
 Gaz Metan Mediaș

Promoted
The teams that were promoted from Divizia B at the start of the season:
 Sportul Studențesc București
 UM Timișoara
 Farul Constanța

Venues

Personnel and kits

League table

Positions by round

Results

Promotion / relegation play-off
The teams placed on the 13th and 14th place in the Divizia A faced the 2nd placed teams from both groups of the Divizia B. Sportul Studențesc and Farul Constanța won the relegation play-offs, thus, they've kept their places in the Liga I, while Cimentul Fieni and FC Baia Mare will still play in Liga II in the 2002–03 season.

Top goalscorers

Champion squad

References

Liga I seasons
Romania
1